Donald Szantho Harrington (July 11, 1914 in Newton, Middlesex County, Massachusetts – September 16, 2005 in Romania) was an American politician and religious leader.

Education
Harrington graduated from the University of Chicago in 1939, and began preaching at the People's Liberal Church on Chicago's South Side.

Career
Harrington became a minister of the Community Church of the New York Unitarian Universalist in New York City in 1944. He retired as senior minister in 1982. He was State Chairman of the Liberal Party of New York, being the "face" of the party which was ruled with an iron fist by Alex Rose until 1976.

In the New York state election, 1966, Harrington ran for Lieutenant Governor of New York on the Liberal ticket with Franklin D. Roosevelt, Jr. They were defeated by the incumbent Republicans Nelson Rockefeller and Malcolm Wilson, but Harrington was elected a delegate to the New York State Constitutional Convention of 1967. A past president of United World Federalists, Harrington wrote Religion in an Age of Science in 1965.

Personal life
In 1939, Harrington married fellow seminary student Vilma Szantho (d. 1982). They had two children: Loni Hancock and David Harrington. In 1984, he married his first wife's niece, Anika Szantho, who was ordained a Unitarian minister in 1990. They lived in Transylvania where Harrington was active in economic development and his wife served several village congregations.

Harrington died from complications of a gall bladder surgery, done in spring 2005, from which he never fully recovered.

References

External links
Donald S. Harrington talks to Richard D. Heffner about contemporary events and his friend and colleague Norman Cousins; Open Mind, 1991
The Community Church of New York Unitarian Universalist
Liberal Party of New York

1914 births
2005 deaths
American Christian clergy
American Unitarians
Politicians from Newton, Massachusetts
Politicians from New York City
University of Chicago alumni
World federalist activists
20th-century American clergy